Ivan Pavlov (1849–1936) was a Russian physiologist.

Ivan Pavlov may also refer to:
Ivan Pavlov (aviator) (1922–1950), twice hero of the Soviet Union
Ivan Pavlov (footballer) (born 1983), Bulgarian football player 
Ivan Pavlov (figure skater) (born 1998), Ukrainian figure skater
Ivan Pavlov (lawyer) (born 1971), Russian lawyer
Ivan Pavlov (film), a 1949 Soviet film 
CoH (musician), alias of Russian-born musician Ivan Pavlov